Acacia jennerae (common name Coonavittra wattle) is a shrub or tree belonging to the genus Acacia and the subgenus Phyllodineae that is endemic to arid parts of central Australia.

Description
The tree typically grows to a height of  an has an erect to spreading habit. It has smooth or finely fissured bark with a tan to reddish brown coloured and glabrous branchlets that are angled or flattened towards the apices. Like most species of Acacia it has phyllodes rather than true leaves. It produces yellow flowers from January to August.

Taxonomy
The species was first formally described by the botanist Joseph Maiden as part of A.J.Ewart and O.B. Davies 1917 work Acacias of the Northern Territory as published in The Flora of the Northern Territory. It was reclassified as Racosperma jennerae by Leslie Pedley in 2003 then transferred back to genus Acacia in 2006. The specific epithet honours Amelia Maud Jenner who was once the librarian at the Royal Botanic Gardens, Sydney.

Distribution
It is native to the Northern Territory and now found in an area in the Wheatbelt and Goldfields-Esperance regions of Western Australia. It is also native to New South Wales and South Australia, and to far south-western Queensland.

See also
List of Acacia species

References

jennerae
Acacias of Western Australia
Flora of the Northern Territory
Flora of Queensland
Flora of South Australia
Flora of New South Wales
Taxa named by Joseph Maiden